Phosalacine is a natural antimicrobial and herbicidal compound that has been isolated from the Actinobacteria Kitasatosporia phosalacinea.

It is a tripeptide consisting of the amino acids glufosinate (phosphinothricin), alanine, and leucine.  It is similar in structure to bialaphos, differing by replacement of the terminal alanine with leucine.

Phosalacine has antimicrobial activity against Gram-positive and Gram-negative bacteria and some fungi. It also shows herbicidal activity against alfalfa.  It is believed that the herbicidal activity is due to the slow release of glufosinate, which is a commercially-used broad spectrum herbicide.

References

Herbicides
Tripeptides
Phosphinic acids